Trevor Hosea (born 24 November 1999) is an Australian rugby union player of Cook Islands descent who plays for the  in the Super Rugby competition. His regular playing position is  lock. Trevor grew up in Narre Warren, Victoria, Australia.

Super Rugby statistics

References

External links
itsrugby.co.uk Profile

Australian rugby union players
Living people
1999 births
Melbourne Rebels players
Melbourne Rising players
Rugby union locks
Rugby union players from Melbourne
People from Narre Warren
People educated at Brisbane Boys' College
Australian people of Cook Island descent